Grgar is a village in western Slovenia in the Municipality of Nova Gorica. It is located under Holy Mount, above the Soča Valley and below the Banjšice Plateau.

Name
Grgar was mentioned in written sources  1370 as Gaergaer and in 1389 as Grêgôr. For phonological and morphological reasons, the latter transcription appears to be a hypercorrection and not connected with Saint Gregory or the name Gregor 'Gregory'. Instead, the name may be derived from another Romance base, perhaps *gregārius 'shepherd'.

Mass graves
Grgar is the site of two known mass graves associated with the Second World War. It contains the remains of Home Guard and Italian prisoners of war, and Slovene and Italian civilians murdered in May 1945. It contains the remains of unknown victims.

Church
The parish church in the settlement is dedicated to Saint Martin and belongs to the Diocese of Koper.

Notable people
Notable people that were born or lived in Grgar include:
Matej Bor, pen name of Vladimir Pavšič (1913–1993), poet

References

External links

Grgar on Geopedia

Populated places in the City Municipality of Nova Gorica